Minority Report is a collection of science fiction stories by American writer Philip K. Dick.  It was first published by Gollancz in 2002.  Most of the stories had originally appeared in the magazines Fantastic Universe, Astounding, Space Science Fiction, Galaxy Science Fiction, Worlds of Tomorrow, and Fantasy and Science Fiction.

Contents

 untitled interview
 Introduction, by Malcolm Edwards
 "The Minority Report"
 "Imposter"
 "Second Variety"
 "War Game"
 "What the Dead Men Say"
 "Oh, to Be a Blobel!"
 "The Electric Ant"
 "Faith of Our Fathers"
 "We Can Remember It for You Wholesale"

References

2002 short story collections
Short story collections by Philip K. Dick